H. F. Russell (dates unknown) was an English first-class cricketer.

Russell represented Hampshire in one first-class match in 1885 against Surrey.

Russell's date of death is lost to history.

External links
H.F. Russell at Cricinfo
H.F. Russell at CricketArchive

English cricketers
Hampshire cricketers
Year of birth missing
Year of death missing